General Larsen may refer to:

Dennis R. Larsen (fl. 1970s–2000s), U.S. Air Force lieutenant general
Henry Louis Larsen (1890–1962), U.S. Marine Corps lieutenant general
Stanley R. Larsen (1915–2000), U.S. Army lieutenant general

See also
General Larson (disambiguation)